The Firefly Role-Playing Game is a science fiction role-playing game released in 2014, written by Monica Valentinelli and set in the universe of the Joss Whedon television show Firefly. It was produced by Margaret Weis Productions, Ltd, and uses the "Cortex Action" variant of Margaret Weis Production's proprietary Cortex Plus game system.

Setting and themes
The Firefly setting is an example of the space Western genre, a blending of science fiction and Western genres, where high technology mixes with frontier life on newly terraformed planets.

This is how the game's core rules describe the game's setting:

Firefly is a space Western television series that debuted on the Fox Television Network in 2002. The show takes place in the 26th century and follows the comings and goings of a close-knit crew led by Captain Malcolm Reynolds.  ...The show follows the trials and tribulations of Mal and eight other folks as they fly around on a Firefly-class transport from job to job, planet to planet, in the year 2517.  Part of what makes the Firefly TV series so much fun to watch is that you find out more about Mal, Zoe, Wash, Simon, River, Jayne, Book, Inara, and Kaylee with each passing episode.  Admittedly, life for Mal and his crew is harder than it needs to be. As it turns out, there's a darn good reason for it-- they insist on surviving on their own terms instead of settling down on Alliance-friendly planets.

In an interview with the GeekNative website, Firefly line developer and lead writer Monica Valentinelli described how the show's setting and theme were central to her process in designing the game:

At their core, every game asks two questions regardless of genre: What do players do when they’re sitting around the table? What does your character do for themselves and for the group? Once you answer those two questions, you will have a strong foundation for a game. Think of these questions as the elevator pitch or tagline – but for a game. In Dune, you’ll play a member of the Spacing Guild who’ll work with other diplomats to ensure the spice keeps flowing from Arrakis. In Firefly, you’ll join a crew to find a job and keep flying across the ‘Verse in spite of many obstacles, e.g, 'Find a Crew, Find a Job, Keep Flying.' Then, once a game designer has those questions answered, we extend out from there: System. Pacing. Conflict. Naming conventions. Worldbuilding. Characters. Equipment.

Valentinelli also said that, in designing this game, "My primary responsibility is to the Browncoat fans, and making sure that I give them as much as possible, both setting-wise and system-wise, to make sure that this is done really well."

Licensing
Although the Firefly RPG is sometimes mistaken for a spin-off from Margaret Weis Production's earlier Serenity Role Playing Game, the two games were produced under separate licenses and utilize very different game systems.  In an interview with BoardGameGeekTV, line developer and lead writer Monica Valentinelli described the differences between the two licenses this way:

In 2005, Margaret Weis Productions put out another game called the Serenity RPG.  ...[The Firefly RPG] is only based on the TV show—it's a completely different license.  It's really kind of fascinating how that works because a lot of fans didn't realize that Universal put out the movie and Fox [put out the TV show].  ...From a business standpoint they're two separate things, but from a universe / continuity standpoint they're not.

Margaret Weis, the game's publisher, described being surprised about receiving a license to produce the Firefly roleplaying game:

Well, it was kind of odd. We turned in a proposal to Fox, just because it was something I had always wanted to do.  I can't remember how long ago, and we didn't hear-- I guess we got a nice little 'thank you' note or something-- and we said, 'Okay, that's that,' and just kind of forgot about it.  And then one day, out of the blue, Fox came to us and said, 'Hey! You know, we really liked what you guys did-- and we were wondering if you'd be interested in having a license?'

System
Monica Valentinelli explained the game systems' design process in an interview with Dungeon Crawlers Radio:

Margaret's vision for the game was to make it really fun and easy to play. But we kind of had a really interesting situation because we have fans of Margaret Weis Productions that remember when the Serenity RPG came out and played the Cortex System, and then for the past eight years we've also had the Cortex Plus system in its various iterations... So, what we did was went back to the drawing board, and our systems team developed a game based on Margaret's wish for this to be easy to play, but also give somewhat of a nod to our roots, without essentially shutting off everything that's been done in the last eight years. So, what we have is a new streamlined system that's been adapted for Firefly.

Cortex Plus—unlike its predecessor, the Cortex System, which was used in the Serenity RPG—is a roll-and-keep system, in which you roll one die from each of several categories and keep the two highest dice in your dice pool.  Cortex Plus uses polyhedral dice common to many roleplaying games and utilizes standard dice notation, ranging from d4 (a 4-sided tetrahedral die) to d12 (a 12-sided dodecahedron die).  The cubed d6 is the "default" die used in the game.

Cortex Plus uses dice pools ranging from d4 (terrible) to d12 (the best possible). Every die in your pool that rolls a natural 1 (called an 'Opportunity') not only doesn't count toward your total but also causes some form of negative consequence for the characters to overcome. Players may voluntarily reduce some of the dice in their pool to a d4, decreasing their likelihood of success and increasing the likelihood of a negative consequence, in exchange for "Plot Points" which may be spent in several ways to influence the game's plot.

In their review of the game, Steven A. Torres-Roman and Carson E. Snow point out that "the Cortex Plus system serves as the engine for several other genre games" and that "Margaret Weis Productions also publishes the Cortex Hacker's Guide, so players who want to dig into the intricacies of the system can do so more easily and come up with a variety of new ideas for their games."

Published books and supplements
As of 2016, Margaret Weis Productions has published six titles in the Firefly Role-Playing Game line: a beta preview of the rules, the core rules, and four printed supplements.  The publisher has also released a digital adventure for the game which hasn't as yet been collected in any of its print materials.

Gaming in the 'Verse: Gen Con 2013 Preview
Gaming in the 'Verse was a preview of the Firefly Role-Playing Game which included a beta edition of the rules, a quickstart character generation system, and two complete adventures.  Both of these adventures were later reprinted in the Echoes of War: Thrillin Heroics supplement.

Included Adventures
 Wedding Planners
 Shooting Fish

Firefly Role-Playing Game (Core rule book)
Firefly Role-Playing Game begins with an episode summary of the Firefly television show, which provides the game's setting:

The Firefly RPG has an extensive episode guide, so that GMs and players who haven't seen the television show and film Serenity will know of the signature crew's encounters and adventures.  Even better, the episode guide comes with gaming examples, demonstrating how events in the show might have played out at the table, so GMs can see how to adjudicate a number of situations. The core book also has an extensive guide to the 'Verse, lots of write-ups for GMCs, and even a small guide to pronouncing Chinese words and a few choice phrases.

Included Adventure
 What's Yours Is Mine

Echoes of War: Thrillin Heroics
Echoes of War: Thrillin' Heroics was the first supplement published for Margaret Weis Productions, Ltd's Firefly Role-Playing Game. It was awarded an ENnie Judges' Spotlight Award at Gen Con 2015.

Contents
Echoes of War collected four digital adventures for the Firefly RPG, (two of which, including the adventure "Wedding Planners" by The New York Times bestselling author Margaret Weis, had previously appeared in the Gaming in the 'Verse preview edition), and published them together under a single cover.  Echoes of War also included a basic set of rules, statistics for all nine crew characters from the Firefly TV show, twelve new character archetypes, and basic ship rules. The adventures in this book all deal with themes of loss and renewal in the aftermath of the Unification War. Each adventure was illustrated with original artwork and presented in a five-to-six act structure.

In its review of Echoes of War, the gaming site Reviews from R'lyeh noted that this title's inclusion of a basic set of rules for the Firefly RPG "means that Firefly Echoes of War: Thrillin' Heroics is a standalone book that can be run using just the rules it contains, or it can be run with access to either version of the rulebook."

This is how Firefly Role-Playing Game brand manager Monica Valentinelli described the original concept for this digital series of adventures in 2013, a year before their print publication:

The logistics of doing a full core book for Gen Con [2013] just wasn't possible, but what we are doing instead, is, we're going to have the Echoes of War line.  It's a digital line of adventures, and each adventure ties back to, or has something to do with, the Unification War. ...Wedding Planners is by Margaret, and then Shooting Fish is by an writer named Andrew Peregrine... those two both have something to do with the Unification War, and you find out what as the adventures continues.  But we're going to be releasing those [in digital format] on a regular basis leading up to [the release of] the core book, so that if people want to play a one-shot or a couple of sessions, just to have fun, there's plenty of game material in each one."

The included adventures were written by Margaret Weis, Andrew Peregrine, Monica Valentinelli, and Nicole Wakelin. Featured artists included Ben Mund, Beth Sobel, Jennifer Rodgers, Kurt Komoda, and Melissa Gay.

Included Adventures
 Wedding Planners
 Shooting Fish
 Friends in Low Places
 Freedom Flyer

Production and release information
Echoes of War was initially released at Gen Con 2014.

Industry Awards
Winner, 2015 ENnie Judges' Spotlight Award

Bucking the Tiger
Bucking the Tiger is a full-length adventure for the Firefly Role-Playing Game which has only been published in a digital format.  It was available for download at the DriveThruRPG web site.

Things Don't Go Smooth
Things Don't Go Smooth is the second supplement published for Margaret Weis Productions, Ltd's Firefly Role-Playing Game. It utilizes the Cortex Plus system.

Contents
Things Don't Go Smooth introduces four new types of non-player characters for Firefly campaigns, and offers advice on how to handle Reaver encounters using the Cortex Plus system. It also includes new rules introducing scene Triggers, a random adventure generator, and two new adventures.

Included Adventures
 Merciless
 Thieves in Heaven

Smuggler's Guide to the Rim
Smuggler's Guide to the Rim is the third supplement published for Margaret Weis Productions, Ltd's Firefly Role-Playing Game. It presents several planetary systems in the Firefly game setting in gazetteer format and expands the game's rules.

Contents
The Smuggler's Guide to the Rim provides expanded setting information for the Blue Sun and Kalidasa Systems, including secret trade routes, places for player characters to hide out, and new game rules for character reputation. It also includes twelve new player character archetypes and several new ship designs. The Smuggler's Guide also includes two new adventures, including one adventure written by The New York Times best-selling author Margaret Weis.

Included Adventures
 All In the Family
 Circling the Wagons

Ghosts in the Black
Ghosts In the Black was the fourth supplement published for Margaret Weis Productions, Ltd's Firefly Role-Playing Game. Robin Laws described his concept for the adventures contained in this supplement as "a pastiche of a property which itself has a heavy element of pastiche in it, because it's a space opera which is actually a tribute to the classic Westerns."

Contents
Ghosts In the Black is a full-length adventure campaign designed by award-winning game designer Robin Laws for the Firefly RPG. The campaign is presented in five interconnected adventures which can either be run consecutively in a single story arc, or as individual adventures.  When played as a campaign, player characters get caught up in the mystery of a missing Alliance vessel called the Westlake. Firefly Role-Playing Game brand manager Monica Valintinelli described the Westlake as "a ghost ship from the Unification War—so there's this legendary battleship that's out there, somewhere, in the black—it's got all these rumors about it."  In the course of the adventures, the player characters are able to collect enough of these rumors to set out in search of the Westlake themselves.

Ghosts In the Black describes its own campaign premise as follows:

Some folk think that the Westlake disappeared after the first battle of the war.  Other travelers believe it happened later on, right before the Battle of Serenity Valley. Before it vanished, the Westlake, a luxury liner originally commandeered as an Alliance troopship, had been modified for prisoner transport. On its run from Hera to Londinium it up and vanished, along with its cargo of Independent POWs and a treasure trove of secrets. 'Ghosts In the Black' gives you and your Crew the opportunity to conclude the Westlake saga, from a false glimmer that establishes its legend in your game, to the final revelation of its mysteries.'

Included Adventures
 Six Cylinders Make a Right
 Prisoner 3102Y
 Tombstone Bullets and a Graveyard Mind
 Hellhound Trail
 The Big Dark

Production Notes
Robin Laws has said that he was approached about writing "a campaign of interlocking adventures" for the Firefly Role-Playing Game at Gen Con 2013, and that he accepted because his "wife would really love it" and "would gladly participate in that homework" if he had to watch all of the shows from the original series again.

Although ICv2 initially reported that Ghosts In the Black would be released in April 2015, the supplement wasn't officially announced on the Margaret Weis Productions, Ltd website until 5 May 2015. Retailer Amazon.com, Inc. provides an actual release date of 22 July 2015.  "Ghosts in the Black" was one of the prizes offered in the Lone Wolf Challenge at Gen Con 2015.

Complete list of published adventures for Firefly Role-Playing Game
 Wedding Planners by Margaret Weis (published in Gaming in the 'Verse and Echoes of War)
 Shooting Fish by Andrew Peregrine (published in Gaming in the 'Verse and Echoes of War)
 What's Yours is Mine by Monica Valentinelli (published in Firefly Role-Playing Game Core Book)
 Friends in Low Places by Monica Valentinelli (published in Echoes of War)
 Freedom Flyer by Nicole Wakelin (published in Echoes of War)
 Bucking the Tiger by Rob Wieland (digital format only)
 Merciless by Monica Valentinelli (published in Things Don't Go Smooth]
 Thieves in Heaven by Monica Valentinelli (published in Things Don't Go Smooth]
 All In the Family by Margaret Weis (published in Smuggler's Guide to the Rim]
 Circling the Wagons by Monica Valentinelli (published in Smuggler's Guide to the Rim]
 Six Cylinders Make a Right by Robin Laws (published in Ghosts in the Black)
 Prisoner 3102Y by Robin Laws (published in Ghosts in the Black)
 Tombstone Bullets and a Graveyard Mind by Robin Laws (published in Ghosts in the Black)
 Hellhound Trail by Robin Laws (published in Ghosts in the Black)
 The Big Dark by Robin Laws (published in Ghosts in the Black)

Industry awards and nominations for Firefly Role-Playing
 2014 Second Runner-Up for Golden Geek Awards Game of the Year
 2014 The Escapist Game of the Year Nominee
 2015 ENnie Nominee for Best Game
 2015 ENnie Nominee for Product of the Year
 2015 Origins Award Nominee
 2015 ENnie Judges' Spotlight Award Winner for Echoes of War: Thrillin' Heroics

Reviews
 Casus Belli (v4, Issue 12 - Nov/Dec 2014)

References

External links
 Game review at Strange Assembly
 List of 2015 ENnie Award Nominees
 Thrillin Heroics review at Neuronphaser
 Things Don't Go Smooth review at Geek Native

American role-playing games
Role-playing games based on television series
Margaret Weis Productions games
Role-playing games introduced in 2014
Firefly (franchise) games
Space opera role-playing games